Oleksiy Rudolfovych Osipov; Aleksei Rudolfovich Osipov (born 2 November 1975) is a former Ukrainian footballer.

Club career
He made his professional debut in the Ukrainian Second League in 1993 for FC Tytan Armyansk.

References

1975 births
Sportspeople from Simferopol
Living people
Ukrainian footballers
Naturalised citizens of Russia
Association football defenders
FC Tytan Armyansk players
FC Krystal Kherson players
SC Tavriya Simferopol players
FC Dynamo Saky players
PFC Krylia Sovetov Samara players
FC Chernomorets Novorossiysk players
FC Arsenal Kyiv players
FC Akhmat Grozny players
FC Aktobe players
FC Ihroservice Simferopol players
Ukrainian Premier League players
Russian Premier League players
Kazakhstan Premier League players
Ukrainian First League players
Ukrainian expatriate footballers
Expatriate footballers in Russia
Expatriate footballers in Kazakhstan